Darmodar Aghost pass (el. 14,340 ft.) is a high mountain pass in Pakistan.

Mountain passes of Khyber Pakhtunkhwa